Roßdorf is a municipality in the district of Darmstadt-Dieburg, in Hesse, Germany. It has a population of 12,619 (as of 2020). It is situated 8 km east of Darmstadt.

Geographic Situation

Neighbouring Towns and Municipalities 
Roßdorf borders in the north and east on the municipality of Groß-Zimmern, in the southeast on the town of Reinheim, in the south on the town of Ober-Ramstadt, and in the west on the city of Darmstadt.

Structure of the Municipality 
The Municipality of Roßdorf is divided into two parts: Gundernhausen and Roßdorf.

Demographic development 
Inhabitants: 
1575: 500 
1635: 50 
1814: 200
2003: 12,114
2005: 12,434
2007: 12,169

History 
The first official mention of Roßdorf is in the year 1250. At this time, Abbot Heinrich vested Counts Diether and Eberhardt I of Katzenelnbogen with the villages of Roßdorf and Gundernhausen. In 1479, the family line died out and the inheritance went to Landgrave Heinrich III of Hesse.

In 1621, Bavarian soldiers took up quarters in Roßdorf and plundered the town. In addition, witch-hunts took place, during which the inhabitants were accused of witchcraft. The worst period for Roßdorf was in the years 1634/35, during the Thirty Years' War. The forces of the Holy Roman Empire and Sweden opposed each other in the region, each in turn laying waste to and scavenging the entire countryside and heavily decimating the population. In the summer of 1635, the plague broke out, reducing the number of inhabitants to 50. In 1672, during the Franco-Dutch War, Louis XIV's troops took up quarters. In 1814, Russian soldiers passed through on their way to France.

In 1852, Roßdorf was incorporated into the district of Darmstadt. Since 1977, amalgamated with its neighbour Gundernhausen, it has belonged to the district of Darmstadt-Dieburg.

Politics

Municipal Council 

The communal election of 26 March 2006 returned the following result (compared to the result from 2001):

Mayor 
Heinrich Kloß (SPD, 1954–1982)
Alfred Jakoubek (SPD, 1982–1997)
Manfred Pfeiffer (SPD, 1997–2003)
Christel Sprößler (SPD, since 2003)

Coat of Arms 
The coat of arms consists of a shield with blue background. At the centre is a silver moon, over which a golden horseshoe hangs. Underneath these, there is a silver rose, the centre of which is blue. The remaining free space is taken up by seven golden stars (five in the upper area, two in the lower area). The coat of arms was approved by the president of the regional government in 1952.

The coat of arms is based on the seal of the combined village court of Roßdorf and Gundernhausen. An imprint of this seal can be found on the so-called "Mansfeld Catalogue of Damages" from 1625, which is kept in the National Archive in Darmstadt. This Catalogue lists the losses suffered by the subjects of the Counts of Katzenelnbogen during the Thirty Years' War. In the 1950s, a face was added to the moon on the coat of arms, a move which has been criticised by many of Roßdorf's inhabitants.

Twinnings 
 Vösendorf in Austria  
 Reggello in Italy 
 Kindberg in Austria 
 Benátky nad Jizerou in the Czech Republic
 Roßdorf in the Rhön region of Thuringia, Germany
 Lichtentanne in the district of Zwickau, in Saxony, Germany

Culture and Tourist Attractions 

 In Roßdorf, there is a Catholic and a Protestant church; in Gundernhausen there is a Protestant church
 The historic town hall (Rathaus) dates from the year 1575
 The Museum of Skilled Trades in Southern Hesse (Südhessische Handwerksmuseum) is located in the old train station (Alter Bahnhof)
 From the summit cross of the "Rehberg", one can take in the view for a great distance in the directions of Aschaffenburg and Frankfurt
 Roßdorf has a large heated outdoor swimming pool
 Adjoining the outdoor swimming pool, there is a roller skating rink, which is used in winter as an ice rink
Roßdorf is famous for horse breeding and in recent years has produced several prize-winning riders.

Clubs and Associations 
The largest club in Roßdorf is the Sport and Cultural Association (Sport- und Kulturgemeinde - SKG - Roßdorf 1877 e.V.)

Roßdorf is also the headquarters of the Gesellschaft zur wissenschaftlichen Untersuchung von Parawissenschaften (GWUP; "Society for the Scientific Investigation of Parasciences"), the European Council of Skeptical Organisations (ECSO) and the Center for Inquiry-Europe.

Transport Infrastructure 
Roßdorf is connected to the Bundesstraße B 26 by three slip roads. (The B 26 has interchanges in Darmstadt with the Autobahns A 5 and A 67 and in Aschaffenburg with the A 3). Roßdorf is also the starting point of the B 38.

In addition, a number of bus routes serve Roßdorf:
K 55:   Darmstadt - Roßdorf - Reinheim - Ueberau/Groß-Bieberau - Niedernhausen 
K 56:   Darmstadt - Roßdorf - Ober-Ramstadt - Rohrbach - Asbach/Lichtenberg
672:   Darmstadt - Roßdorf - Gundernhausen - Groß-Zimmern - Dieburg
673:   Darmstadt - Roßdorf - Gundernhausen Stetteritz
693:   Darmstadt - Roßdorf - Reinheim - Gr.-Bieberau - Brensbach - Reichelsheim - Fürth (not all buses serve Fürth)

The rail line between the "Darmstadt Ost" and "Bessunger Forsthaus" halts is still occasionally used for historical train rides. The rest of the line between Darmstadt and Groß Zimmern has been dismantled.

Notable people
 Georg Christian Bonhard (1770 in Gundernhausen - 1836), physician
 Christian Sartorius (1796 in Gundernhausen - 1872 in Mirador, Mexico), theologist, pedagogue and author, as well as sugar cane plantation owner in Mexico
 Heinz Friedrich (1922–2004), journalist, publisher and author
 Klaus Teuber (born 1952), inventor of The Settlers of Catan; probably the best known German board game designer
 Lisa Edling (born 1980), "Wine Queen" of the Bergstraße Region 2002/2003, "German Wine Princess" 2003
 Flix (Felix Görmann, born 1976), comic book artist
 Yannick Lebherz (born 1989), swimmer
 Andre Greipel, road sprinter (cycling)

Companies 
 Envirochemie GmbH – a company that designs and manufactures wastewater treatment facilities

Literature 
Mein Dorf, Heinz Friedrich, Munich 1996, (available only in German language)

References

External links 
  

Darmstadt-Dieburg